Leno is a surname. Notable people with the surname include:

 Bernd Leno (born 1992), German footballer
 Dan Leno (1860–1904), English music hall comedian
 Jay Leno (born 1950), American comedian, actor, voice actor, writer, producer, and television host
 John Bedford Leno (1826–1894), English radical activist
 Mark Leno (born 1951), United States politician
 Charles Leno Jr. (born 1991), NFL Offensive Lineman